Mabank is a town in Henderson, Van Zandt and Kaufman counties in the U.S. state of Texas.

History

Prior to the existence of Mabank in early 1900, the community of Lawndale was formed in the late 1880s. The community was noted for its agriculture in many areas, including cotton. With the Texas Trunk Railroad missing the community by a mile, though, ranchers Mason and Eubank decided to capitalize on the Texas Trunk and set aside one square mile of land and named it "Mabank".

Mabank is a combination of the names Eubank and Mason, and is located one mile (1.6 km) southwest of the former community of Lawndale. Being only a mile away from Lawndale and located on the railroad, its citizens, churches, and businesses naturally decided to move there, thus attracting, over a brief period of about two years, much of what was Lawndale. This included the Lawndale Courier—the local newspaper that renamed itself the Mabank Courier.

The population, although small, remained relatively stable until the completion of Cedar Creek Reservoir in 1965. The town has since shown increases in population. Many of the descendants from the Masons and Eubanks still have connections to the town.

Geography
Mabank is located in the southeast corner of Kaufman County at  (32.368011, –96.105573). The town limits extend south into Henderson County. U.S. Route 175 runs through the north side of the town, leading northwest  to Kaufman and southeast  to Athens.

Demographics

As of the 2020 United States census, there were 4,050 people, 1,175 households, and 720 families residing in the town.

Education

Mabank is served by the Mabank Independent School District. The schools are Central Elementary, Southside Elementary, Lakeview Elementary, Mabank Intermediate School, Mabank Jr. High and Mabank High School.

Parks and recreation
Mabank is located on the northern and eastern edge of Cedar Creek Reservoir, a popular destination for weekend visitors from the Dallas-Fort Worth Metroplex.

Notable people

 Lindley Beckworth, former U.S. Congressman and judge
 Isiah Robertson, former NFL player who started the " House of Isaiah", a drug treatment program in Mabank
 Randal Tye Thomas, lived in Mabank from 1980 to 1996. Thomas was the 13th mayor of Gun Barrel City, Texas, (at the age of 21) and served in that capacity from 2000 to 2001, when he resigned

References

External links
 City of Mabank official website
 Mabank Police Department website
 Mabank Independent School District website
 Mabankonline.com, community website
 Mabank entry from the NCTCOG almanac
 

Dallas–Fort Worth metroplex 
Towns in Henderson County, Texas
Towns in Kaufman County, Texas
Towns in Texas
Populated places established in 1900
1900 establishments in Texas
U.S. Route 175